Proto-Sinaitic (also referred to as Sinaitic, Proto-Canaanite when found in Canaan, the North Semitic alphabet, or Early Alphabetic) is considered the earliest trace of alphabetic writing and the common ancestor of both the Ancient South Arabian script and the Phoenician alphabet, which led to many modern alphabets including the Greek alphabet. According to common theory, Canaanites or Hyksos who spoke a Semitic language repurposed Egyptian hieroglyphs to construct a different script. The script is attested in a small corpus of inscriptions found at Serabit el-Khadim in the Sinai Peninsula, Egypt, dating to the Middle Bronze Age (2100–1500 BC). 

The earliest Proto-Sinaitic inscriptions are mostly dated to between the mid-19th (early date) and the mid-16th (late date) century BC.

However, the discovery of the Wadi el-Hol inscriptions near the Nile River indicates that the script originated in Egypt. The evolution of Proto-Sinaitic and the various Proto-Canaanite scripts during the Bronze Age is based on rather scant epigraphic evidence; it is only with the Bronze Age collapse and the rise of new Semitic kingdoms in the Levant that Proto-Canaanite is clearly attested (Byblos inscriptions 10th–8th century BC, Khirbet Qeiyafa inscription c. 10th century BC).

The Proto-Sinaitic inscriptions were discovered in the winter of 1904–1905 in Sinai by Hilda and Flinders Petrie. To this may be added a number of short Proto-Canaanite inscriptions found in Canaan and dated to between the 17th and 15th centuries BC, and more recently, the discovery in 1999 of the Wadi el-Hol inscriptions, found in Middle Egypt by John and Deborah Darnell. The Wadi el-Hol inscriptions strongly suggest a date of development of Proto-Sinaitic writing from the mid-19th to 18th centuries BC.

Discovery 
In the winter of 1905, Flinders Petrie and his wife Hilda were conducting a series of archaeological excavations in the Sinai Peninsula. During a dig at Serabit el-Khadim, an extremely lucrative turquoise mine used between the Twelfth and Thirteenth Dynasty and again between the Eighteenth and mid-Twentieth Dynasty, Petrie discovered a series of inscriptions at the site's massive invocative temple to Hathor, as well as some fragmentary inscriptions in the mines themselves. Petrie immediately recognized hieroglyphic characters in the inscriptions, but upon closer inspection realized the script was wholly alphabetic and not the combination of logograms and syllabics as in Egyptian script proper. He thus assumed that the inscriptions showed a script that the turquoise miners had devised themselves, using linear signs that they had borrowed from hieroglyphics. He published his findings in London the following year.

Ten years later, in 1916, Alan Gardiner, one of the premier Egyptologists of the early and mid-20th century, published his own interpretation of Petrie's findings, arguing that the glyphs appeared to be early versions of the signs used for later Semitic languages such as Phoenician, and was able to assign sound values and reconstructed names to some of the letters by assuming they represented what would later become the common Semitic abjad. One example was the character , to which Gardiner assigned the ⟨b⟩ sound, on the grounds that it derived from the Egyptian glyph for 'house' , and was very similar to the Phoenician letter,  bet, whose name derives from the Semitic word for “house”, bayt. Using his hypothesis, Gardiner was able to affirm Petrie's hypothesis that the mystery inscriptions were of a religious nature, as his model allowed an often recurring word to be reconstructed as lbʿlt, meaning "to Ba'alat" or more accurately, "to (the) Lady" – that is, the "lady" Hathor. Likewise, this allowed another recurring word mʿhbʿlt to be translated as "Beloved of (the) Lady", a reading which became very acceptable after the lemma was found carved underneath a hieroglyphic inscription which read "Beloved of Hathor, Lady of Turquoise". Gardiner's hypothesis allowed researchers to connect the letters of the inscriptions to modern Semitic alphabets, and resulted in the inscriptions becoming much more readable, leading to the immediate acceptance of his hypothesis.

Proto-Sinaitic inscriptions

Serabit inscriptions 
The Sinai inscriptions are best known from carved graffiti and votive texts from a mountain in the Sinai called Serabit el-Khadim and its temple to the Egyptian goddess Hathor. The mountain contained turquoise mines which were visited by repeated expeditions over 800 years. Many of the workers and officials were from the Nile Delta, and included large numbers of Canaanites (i.e. speakers of an early form of Northwest Semitic ancestral to the Canaanite languages of the Late Bronze Age) who had been allowed to settle the eastern Delta.

Most of the forty or so inscriptions have been found among much more numerous hieratic and hieroglyphic inscriptions, scratched on rocks near and in the turquoise mines and along the roads leading to the temple.

The date of the inscriptions is mostly placed in the 17th or 16th century BC. An alternative view dates most of the inscriptions to the reign of Amenemhat III or his successor circa 1800 BC.

Four inscriptions have been found in the temple, on two small human statues and on either side of a small stone sphinx. They are crudely done, suggesting that the workers who made them were illiterate apart from this script.

Inscriptions in Canaan 
Only a few inscriptions have been found in Canaan itself, dated to between the 17th and 15th centuries BC. They are all very short, most consisting of only a couple of letters, and may have been written by Canaanite caravaners or soldiers from Egypt. They sometimes go by the name "Proto-Canaanite", although the term "Proto-Canaanite" is also applied to early Phoenician or Ancient Hebrew writings.

Wadi el-Hol inscriptions 

The Wadi el-Hol inscriptions ( Wādī al-Hawl 'Ravine of Terror') were carved on the stone sides of an ancient high-desert military and trade road linking Thebes and Abydos, in the heart of literate Egypt. They have been dated to somewhere between 1900 and 1800 BC. They are in a wadi in the Qena bend of the Nile, at approx. , among dozens of hieratic and hieroglyphic inscriptions.. Rock inscriptions in the valley appear to show the oldest examples of phonetic alphabetic writing discovered to date.

The inscriptions are graphically very similar to the Serabit inscriptions, but show a greater hieroglyphic influence, such as a glyph for a man that was apparently not read alphabetically: The first of these (h1) is a figure of celebration [Gardiner A28], whereas the second (h2) is either that of a child [Gardiner A17] or of dancing [Gardiner A32]. If the latter, h1 and h2 may be graphic variants (such as two hieroglyphs both used to write the Canaanite word hillul "jubilation") rather than different consonants.
A28 A17 A32 Hieroglyphs representing, reading left to right, celebration, a child, and dancing. The first appears to be the prototype for h1, while the latter two have been suggested as the prototype for h2.

Brian Colless has published a translation of the text, in which some of the signs are treated as logograms (representing a whole word, not just a single consonant) or rebuses:
[Vertical] mšt r h ʿnt ygš ʾl
[Vertical] Excellent banquet (mšt r[ʾš]) of the celebration (h[illul]) of ʿAnat (ʿnt). [It] will provide (ygš) ʾEl (ʾl)
[Horizontal] rb wn mn h ngṯ h ʾ p mẖ r
[Horizontal] plenty (rb) of wine (wn) [and] victuals (mn) for the celebration (h[illul]). We will sacrifice (ngṯ) to her (h) an ox (ʾ[lp]) and (p) a prime fatling (mẖ r[ʾš])."

Here, aleph, whose glyph depicts the head of an ox, is a logogram used to represent the word "ox" (*ʾalp), he, whose glyph depicts a man in celebration, is a logogram for the words "celebration" (*hillul) and "she/her" (hiʾ‎), and resh, whose glyph depicts a man's head, is a logogram for the word "utmost/greatest" (*raʾš). This interpretation fits into the pattern in some of the surrounding Egyptian inscriptions, with celebrations for the goddess Hathor involving inebriation.

  Proto-Canaanite 
 Synonym for Proto-Sinaitic 
Proto-Canaanite, also referred to as Proto-Canaan, Old Canaanite, or Canaanite, is the name given to the Proto-Sinaitic script (c. 16th century BC), when found in Canaan.

 Synonym for Paleo-Phoenician or Paleo-Hebrew script Proto-Canaanite is also used when referring to the ancestor of the Phoenician or Paleo-Hebrew script, respectively, before some cut-off date, typically 1050 BC, with an undefined affinity to Proto-Sinaitic.

While no extant inscription in the Phoenician alphabet is older than c. 1050 BC, Proto-Canaanite is used for the early alphabets as used during the 13th and 12th centuries BC in Phoenicia. However, the Phoenician, Hebrew, and other Canaanite dialects were largely indistinguishable before the 11th century BC, and the writing system is essentially identical. A possible example of Proto-Canaanite, the inscription on the Ophel pithos, was found in 2012 on a pottery storage jar during the excavations of the south wall of the Temple Mount by Israeli archaeologist Eilat Mazar in Jerusalem. Inscribed on the pot are some big letters about an inch high, of which only five are complete, and traces of perhaps three additional letters written in Proto-Canaanite script.

  History 

The letters of the earliest script used for Semitic languages were derived from Egyptian hieroglyphs. In the 19th century, the theory of Egyptian origin competed alongside other theories that the Phoenician script developed from Akkadian cuneiform, Cretan hieroglyphs, the Cypriot syllabary, and Anatolian hieroglyphs. Then the Proto-Sinaitic inscriptions were studied by Alan Gardiner who identified the word  "Lady" occurring several times in inscriptions, and also attempted to decipher other words. In the 1950s and 1960s, William Albright published interpretations of Proto-Sinaitic as the key to show the derivation of the Canaanite alphabet from hieratic, leading to the commonly accepted belief that the language of the inscriptions was Semitic and that the script had a hieratic prototype.

The Proto-Sinaitic inscriptions, along with the contemporary parallels found in Canaan and Wadi el-Hol, are thus hypothesized to show an intermediate step between Egyptian hieratic and the Phoenician alphabet.

According to the "alphabet theory", the early Semitic proto-alphabet reflected in the Proto-Sinaitic inscriptions would have given rise to both the Ancient South Arabian script and the Proto-Canaanite alphabet by the time of the Late Bronze Age collapse (1200–1150 BC). Albright hypothesized that only the graphic form of the Proto-Sinaitic characters derive from Egyptian hieroglyphs, because they were given the sound value of the first consonant of the Semitic translation of the hieroglyph (many hieroglyphs had already been used acrophonically in Egyptian.)

For example, the hieroglyph for pr "house" (a rectangle partially open along one side, "O1" in Gardiner's sign list) was adopted to write Semitic , after the first consonant of baytu, the Semitic word for "house".This is in marked contrast to the history of adoption of the Phoenician alphabet in the Iron Age (where ʾālep gave rise to the Greek letter aleph, i.e. the Semitic term for "ox" was left untranslated and adopted as simply the name of the letter). According to the alphabet hypothesis, the shapes of the letters would have evolved from Proto-Sinaitic forms into Phoenician forms, but most of the names of the letters would have remained the same.

An alternative hypothesis was recently proposed by Brian Colless (2014), who believes that 18 of the 22 letters of the Phoenician alphabet have counterparts in the Byblos syllabary, and it seems that the proto-alphabet evolved as a simplification of the syllabary, moving from syllabic to consonantal writing, in the style of the Egyptian script (which did not normally indicate vowels); this goes against the Goldwasser hypothesis (2010) that the original alphabet was invented by miners in Sinai.

A transitional stage between Proto-Canaanite and Old Phoenician (1000–800 BC) has been proposed by authors such as Werner Pichler as the origin of the Libyco-Berber script used among Ancient Libyans (i.e. Proto-Berbers) – citing common similarities to both Proto-Canaanite proper and its early North Arabian descendants.

 Synopsis 
Below is a table synoptically showing selected Proto-Sinaitic signs and the proposed correspondences with Phoenician letters and Egyptian hieroglyphs. Also shown are the sound values, names, and descendants of the Phoenician letters.
For the Ancient South Arabian and Libyco-Berber scripts only the letters with Proto-Canaanite correspondences are shown.

 The Other section shows the corresponding Modern Greek, Etruscan, Latin, Glagolitic, Old Cyrillic, and Cyrillic letters.

 See also 
Tell es-Safi inscription
Ugaritic alphabet

 References 

 Further reading 
 Albright, William F. (1966). The Proto-Sinaitic Inscriptions and their Decipherment.
 I. Biggs, M. Dijkstra, Corpus of Proto-sinaitic Inscriptions, Alter Orient und Altes Testament, Neukirchener Verlag, 1990.
 
 
 
 
 Colless, Brian E., "The Byblos Syllabary and the Proto-alphabet", Abr-Nahrain / Ancient Near Eastern Studies 30 (1992) 15–62.
 
 Colless, Brian E., "The Origin of the Alphabet: An Examination of the Goldwasser Hypothesis", Antiguo Oriente 12 (2014) 71–104.
 Stefan Jakob Wimmer / Samaher Wimmer-Dweikat: The Alphabet from Wadi el-Hôl – A First Try, in: Göttinger Miszellen. Beiträge zur ägyptologischen Diskussion, Heft 180, Göttingen 2001, p. 107–111
 
 Hamilton, Gordon J, The origins of the West Semitic alphabet in Egyptian scripts (2006)
 Fellman, Bruce (2000) "The Birthplace of the ABCs." Yale Alumni Magazine, December 2000.
 
 Goldwasser, Orly, How the Alphabet Was Born from Hieroglyphs Biblical Archaeology Review 36:02, Mar/Apr 2010.
 
 Millard, A. R. (1986) "The Infancy of the Alphabet" World Archaeology. pp. 390–398.
 Ray, John D. (1986) "The Emergence of Writing in Egypt" Early Writing Systems; 17/3 pp. 307–316.
 B. Benjamin Sass (West Semitic Alphabets) – In 1988 a very important doctoral dissertation was completed at Tel Aviv University, *Benjamin Sass, The Genesis of the Alphabet and its Development in the Second Millennium BC'', Ägypten und Altes Testament 13, Otto Harrassowitz, Wiesbaden, 1988.

https://archive.org/details/isbn_9780195079937/page/89/mode/1up

External links 

 Proto-Sinaitic inscriptions (byu.edu)
 Proto-Sinaitic - 18th-14th cent. B.C., Mnamon Ancient writing systems in the Mediterranean
 Escritura Proto-sinaítica (in Spanish), Promotora Española de Lingüística (Proel).

Wadi el-Hol
 USC West Semitic Research Project site on Wadi el-Hol, with photos
 Yale news article on Wadi el-Hol from 2000 Dec
 Archeology article on Wadi el-Hol from 2000 Jan
 New York Times article on Wadi el-Hol from 1999 Nov
 BBC article on Wadi el-Hol from 1999 Nov

 
19th-century BC establishments
1904 archaeological discoveries
2nd millennium BC in Egypt
Abjad writing systems
Bronze Age writing systems
Canaanite languages
Canaanite writing systems
Middle Kingdom of Egypt
Semitic writing systems
Sinai Peninsula
Undeciphered writing systems